Kang Dong-suk (born May 25, 1969;  Donald Kang) is a yachtsman and adventurer from South Korea.

On June 8, 1997, he became the first Korean to sail around the world single-handedly, when he completed a circumnavigation on a 30-foot (9.2-meter) sailboat Pioneer 2 (선구자 2), covering over 70,000 kilometers in 3 years and 5 months.  In 1991, he completed the first single-handed sailing voyage of the Pacific by a Korean in his first sailboat Pioneer 1 (선구자 1), a 29-foot (8.7-meter) boat, travelling the distance of 11,700 kilometers in 7 months.  After arriving in Korea, he donated the Pioneer 1 to the Korea Naval Academy.

The Republic of Korea Navy, in recognition of Kang's sailing achievements, awarded him the first ever Honorary Member of the Republic of Korea Navy (명예해군) title. In November 1997, following his return from the sailing solo-circumnavigation, South Korean President Kim Young-sam invited Kang to the Blue House and awarded him the "New Korean" (신한국인) title.

In 1999, as a member of a Korean climbing team, he attempted to summit Broad Peak in the Himalayas, the 12th highest mountain in the world.  The team had to turn back when a climbing member fell to his death.

After his return from the Himalayas, Kang graduated from UCLA and worked at Deloitte as a public accountant.  In 2005, Kang served as the expedition manager for the Korean mountaineer Park Young-seok's North Pole expedition, supporting Park achieve an Explorers Grand Slam.  Park became the first person to climb all 14 Eight-thousanders and achieve the Explorers Grand Slam.

Kang chronicled his sailing adventures in his book Yes I am passionate about the sea.  He also gives frequent lectures about his experience and expeditions. Sailboats (Pioneers 1 and 2) used by Kang for his sailing voyages are on display at the Korea Naval Academy and the Korea National Maritime Museum. Kang currently resides in the San Francisco Bay Area, working as an accountant.

Notable expeditions

Books 
 인생은 탐험이다   Life is Exploration 2022
 그래 나는 바다에 미쳤다   Yes, I am passionate about the sea 1997

Recognitions

References

External links 

Pioneer 2 page on Korea National Maritime Museum website
Solo-circumnavigation arrival in Busan, Korea covered live by Seoul Broadcasting System in 1997, on YouTube

1969 births
Living people
South Korean emigrants to the United States
Single-handed sailors
Single-handed circumnavigating sailors
Circumnavigators of the globe
South Korean sailors